The Prairie View Bowl was a postseason college football bowl game normally held on New Year's Day in Houston, Texas. The game was first held following the 1928 season. The annual game matched Prairie View  A&M against a team from another historically black college or university (HBCU). From 1929 through 1952 the game was played in Buffalo Stadium, which was primarily a Minor League Baseball park. In 1953 the game moved to Public School Stadium (renamed Jeppesen Stadium in 1958) where it remained until the bowl folded. The 33rd and last game was played January 1, 1961. Prairie View's record in the 33 games was 19–12–2.

Game results

See also
 List of college bowl games

Notes

References

Defunct college football bowls
American football in Houston
Sports competitions in Houston
1929 establishments in Texas
1961 disestablishments in Texas
Recurring sporting events established in 1929
Recurring sporting events disestablished in 1961